Sebastian Bartlewski (born 13 June 1994) is a Polish professional footballer who plays as an attacking midfielder for III liga club Stolem Gniewino.

References

External links
 
 

1994 births
Living people
Polish footballers
Poland youth international footballers
Association football midfielders
Ekstraklasa players
I liga players
II liga players
III liga players
Podbeskidzie Bielsko-Biała players
Ząbkovia Ząbki players
Olimpia Grudziądz players
Kotwica Kołobrzeg footballers
Bałtyk Gdynia players
Olimpia Elbląg players
Sportspeople from Gdynia